Rooney is an unincorporated community in Carter County, Kentucky, United States.

Notes

Unincorporated communities in Carter County, Kentucky
Unincorporated communities in Kentucky